Mufti is a 2017 Indian Kannada-language neo-noir action thriller film directed by Narthan, making his debut, and produced by Jayanna Combines. The film tells the story of an undercover cop, played by Sriimurali, who tracks down and confronts a crime boss, played by Shiva Rajkumar.

Production started in July 2016, and the film was released on 1 December 2017. The film received positive response from critics. The film was declared blockbuster at the box office and was one of the highest-grossing movies in Shivarajkumar's career.

The film is being remade in Tamil as Pathu Thala starring Silambarasan and Gautham Karthik. Film's prequel titled as Bhairati Ranagal shooting started in March 2023.

Plot

Gana, an undercover cop disguised as an assassin, works at a crime syndicate in Mangalore for 2 years. One day, Gana heads to the village of Ronapura in order to serve Bhairathi Ranagal, a crime boss who rules the village. Gana arrives at Ronapura under the commissioner's orders that his identity should be concealed and not known to anyone. Gana arrives in Ronapura, where he is received by Vishnu and meets Kashi, who heads Bhairathi Ranagal's cement company. 

Gurukanth Bhandri is selected for the Chief Ministerial Candidate in Karnataka and is targeting Ronapura for the elections, but their party member MP Ekanath Nimbalkar has died in the accident planned by Bhairathi, due to which Raghuveer Bhandri, Gurukanth's brother meets social worker and environmentalist Ashwath Kudari to be the new the candidate for the party, but Gunari refuses. Gana earns Bhairathi's left-hand man Singa and right-hand man Shabari's trust by helping the gang remove the stock black money from a goods train and is further asked by Shabari and Singa for the operations, while also earning Kashi's jealousy towards Gana. Ashwath Kudari holds a rally against Bhairathi for polluting the environment due to his mining operations. Bhairathi orchestrates a riot at the village and burns the houses of those persons who are supporting Kudari's rally, due to this Kudari joins Raghuveer Bhandari's campaign.

Meanwhile, Kashi brings the cop (who happens to be the one who helped Gana in the undercover operation and also doesn't know Gana's identity), who leaked the information of unaccounted money on a goods train and tells Gana to shoot him, Gana reluctantly shoots him and feels guilty about the incident, which makes him determined to arrest Bhairathi. The next day, Bhairathi arrives at the mining where Nimbalkar's killers are caught, which is revealed that Bhairathi did not kill Nimbalkar. Gana saves Bhairathi from a temple attack orchestrated by Pashupathi, who is running for MP nomination in elections. Bhairathi attacks Pashupathi and warns him of dire consequences. Bhairathi invites Gana to his house for dinner where he meets Bhairathi's sister Vedhavathi and daughter Avni. 

While Bhairathi goes for a stroll at 4:00AM, Gana sneaks into Bhairathi's house and collects various bank account numbers in a book named Sri Ramayana Darshanam and escapes minutes before Bhairathi arrives and reaches his hideout to find Kashi, having deduced his identity and calls Singa in front of Gana to inform him about Gana's identity, but Singa calls Gana and tells him to finish Kashi. Gana reveals that he created evidence that Kashi is in cahoots with Pashupathi to kill Bhairathi, where he kills Kashi and checks the account transfer, only to find that the money was transferred to orphanages, old-age homes and Public schools. Gana realizes about Bhairathi's good intentions to help the people, when he constructed houses for the villagers' welfare and the villagers revere Bhairathi as their saviour. 

Bhairathi is accused of the attacking Kudari, but Bhairathi catches the culprit, who happens to be Bhairathi's driver. The driver is killed and Bhairathi gifts Kudari with plants and flowers as compensation and ask him to stand independently in the elections. It is revealed that Raghuveer Bhandari is the mastermind behind the attacks. While heading for the election office. The car, in which Bhairathi and Gana are travelling, explodes killing them. Raghuveer Bhandari bribed Shabari to kill Bhairathi, in return for nominating him in the Ronapura Constituency elections. When Shabari reaches the office, Bhairathi and Gana, who survived the attack confronts Shabari where Gana gives Shabari's watch to Shabari as he noticed Bhairathi wearing Shabari's watch and deducing his trap. Bhairathi kills Shabari and hangs him at the lamp post near Raghuveer's house and warns him not to interfere. 

Vedhavathi (who berates Bhairathi for killing Avni's father/Vedhavathi's husband) listens to the conversation of Singa and Gana where she finds that her husband was involved in a medical scam, which killed millions of villagers due to which Bhairathi had killed him. Gana reunites Vedhavathi and Bhairathi on the former's birthday, where he meets Bhairathi, who tells him that he is indebted to Gana where Gana learns about Bhairathi's dark past and hatred towards the Government. After this, Gana leaves Ronapura with the evidence as directed by the commissioner. While heading to the commissioner's office, Gana is knocked by Raghuveer Bhandari in a car accident. Bhairathi leaves for his father's grave all alone until Raghuveer Bhandri arrives with his henchmen intending to kill him. Gana (having survived the attack) arrives at the venue, and battles with Raghuveer's henchmen, who is also joined by Bhairathi where the two finish the henchmen and kill Raghuveer Bhandari by slashing his throat. 

Upon seeing Gana's integrity, Bhairathi surrenders himself to the police and finds the portrait, which he showed it to Avni as a gift from Gana. Gana is appointed as ACP and joins the office where he finds the Sri Ramayana Darshanam book where he learns that Bhairathi knew about Gana's identity all along, where Bhairathi is also reading the book's copy in the prison.

Cast 
 Shiva Rajkumar as Bhairathi Ranagal, a gang boss
 Sriimurali as Gana, an undercover police officer  
 Shanvi Srivastava as Raksha, Gana's girlfriend
 Chaya Singh as Vedhavathi, sister of Bhairathi Ranagal
 Madhu Guruswamy as Singa, a member of Bhairathi Ranagal's gang
 Vasishta N. Simha as Kashi, a member of Bhairathi Ranagal's gang
 Babu Hirannaiah as Shabari, Bhairathi Ranagal's right-hand man 
 Devaraj as Raghuveer Bhandari, a corrupt politician
 Sadhu Kokila as Ad Hero 
 Prakash Belawadi as Environmentalist Ashwath Gunari 
 Chikkanna as James Jackson, Ad director
 Bala Rajwadi 
 Raj Surya as Ronnie
Shekhar Rao 
Bus Kumar 
Manjunath Hegde 
 Vinay Krishnaswamy

Soundtrack

Ravi Basrur composed two original tracks for the film and scored its background music. He previously worked with Narthan on Ugramm and Rathavara.

Original tracklist

Reception
Sunayana Suresh of The Times of India gave 3.5 out of 5 and wrote "This is definitely one of the more interesting narratives that have been told on Sandalwood screen this year and it is worth that visit to the halls if intriguing and innovative commercial dramas are what you like." A Sharadhaa of The New Indian Express wrote "Mufti looks promising and will be another film in Sriimurali’s hit list, and Shivarajkumar’s role will stay in the minds of moviegoers." 

Karthik Keramalu of Firstpost wrote "Mufti is a multi-starrer that’s designed to cater to fans of both Shiva Rajkumar and Sriimurali." Indiaglitz gave 4 out of 5 and wrote "Srimurali in the first half wins convincingly for his action, minimum of dialogues; it is Shivarajakumar occupies the whole of second half for his composed performance. The action scenes are very less to Dr Shiv. When he holds his favorite sharp edge weapon ‘Long’ (that he has been holding since Om in 1995), the fans cheer up with his ‘Samhara’."

Accolades

Remake
The film is remade in Tamil as Pathu Thala by Studio Green. Starring Silambarasan and Gautham Karthik. It was directed by Obeli N. Krishna is set release on March 2023.

References

External links 
 

2017 films
2010s Kannada-language films
Indian action thriller films
2017 action thriller films
Fictional portrayals of the Karnataka Police
Films about organised crime in India
Films based on Indian folklore
Indian nonlinear narrative films
Indian gangster films
2010s police procedural films
Indian crime action films
2017 crime action films
Kannada films remade in other languages
2017 directorial debut films